Robin Charles Brundle (born 19 September 1962 in King's Lynn, Norfolk) is a British racing driver and businessman. In January 2009, he was appointed as managing director of Lola Cars. He still occasionally competes in historic racing events. Robin is the younger brother of former Formula One driver and current Sky Sports F1 commentator Martin Brundle.

He previously ran a family car dealership in his home town of King's Lynn known as the Brundle Group. In 2007 he was appointed managing director of Aston Martin Racing, before moving on to Lola. He was appointed as a non-executive director of the Queen Elizabeth Hospital, King's Lynn in 2006.

Robin is married with two children. He is also a keen hockey player.

Racing career
Robin has competed in a variety of racing events throughout his career. After competing in the MG Metro Challenge in 1983, he got a works drive for the ARG Metro team in the British Touring Car Championship in 1984. In 1985, he made a one off appearance in Truck racing for Renault in the British Truck Grand Prix. He competed in one season of the British Formula Three Championship in 1986. Since then he has raced in various national saloon car championships with a BMW M3, Ford Sierra and Honda CRX. He is a three time class winner of the Willhire 24 Hour - in 1980 and 1982, both times with brother Martin, and again in 1991. He last competed in the BTCC in 1990.

Racing record

Complete British Saloon / Touring Car Championship results
(key) (Races in bold indicate pole position – 1973–1990 in class) (Races in italics indicate fastest lap – 1 point awarded ?–1989 in class)

† Events with 2 races staged for the different classes.

Complete European Touring Car Championship results

(key) (Races in bold indicate pole position) (Races in italics indicate fastest lap)

References

External links
Lola Group

1962 births
Living people
Sportspeople from King's Lynn
English racing drivers
British Formula Three Championship drivers
British Touring Car Championship drivers